Naracoorte Airport  is located  south of the town centre in Naracoorte, South Australia.

See also
 List of airports in South Australia

References

External links
Naracoorte Airport at the Naracoorte Lucindale Council

Airports in South Australia
Limestone Coast